There were four bowling events at the 2014 South American Games. The top 4 of each doubles tournament qualifies to compete at the 2015 Pan American Games in Toronto, Ontario, Canada.

Medalists

4th place in the men's doubles was Argentina and 4th place in the women's doubles was Chile.

References

Bowling
South American Games
Qualification tournaments for the 2015 Pan American Games
2014